Koala Kid (also known as Outback or The Outback) is a 2012 computer-animated action comedy film directed by Kyung Ho Lee. It was released in South Korea on January 12, 2012. The English dub cast consists of Rob Schneider, Bret McKenzie, Frank Welker, Yvonne Strahovski, Alan Cumming, Tim Curry, and Chris Edgerly.

Plot
In Australia, a white koala named Johnny is teased about his color, so he joins a traveling circus with the help of Hamish, a Tasmanian Devil, and Higgens, a spider monkey photographer. He is disappointed that he is part of the freak show instead of the main acts in the big tent. The top act is "Wild Bushman" who takes all the audience from the freak show. Johnny checks out the show and accidentally becomes part of it, and The Wild Bushman saves him.

While traveling to a new location, their wagon train car becomes unattached and crashes in the desert of "The Outback". On their quest to go to the next location of the traveling circus, "Precipice Lake", they come upon a billabong. They witness from their cliff location a pack of dingos, Blacktooth, Loki, Cutter, and Butch, as well as their thylacine ally Hex, chasing a bilby but is rescued by a kangaroo named Mac, a wombat army, and Miranda, a vine-swinging female koala talented at throwing a boomerang. A vulture named Boris reveals that a Saltwater crocodile named Bog intends to take over the billabong. When their rescue goes wrong, and the dingos threaten to take over, the rock Johnny is on breaks free, and he slides down the cliff and ends up rolling on top of a boulder, chasing the dingos away. Hamish introduces the now-famous white koala as "Koala Kid". Miranda is unimpressed, but Johnny watches her from a tree as she practices. When noticed, Miranda breaks the branch he is on with her boomerang and complains about him watching in secret. He tries to lie out of that accusation but ends up suggesting he is an expert at the boomerang and is proven wrong when offered to try it himself.

Hamish plans to take photos of Johnny doing heroic stuff and make him famous as Koala Kid, so when they get back to the circus, they can get in the main act rather than the freak show and earn Hamish more money. Bog is not impressed with his gang getting chased by a koala, so he orders them to capture Koala Kid. In the chase, Miranda's younger sister Charlotte gets covered with cosmetic powder and mistaken for the Koala Kid resulting in her getting kidnapped. The billabong residents plan to rescue Charlotte but must cross the dangerous "Bungle Bungles" on their way to Precipice Lake. This convinces Hamish to go along with Johnny's conscience and join the team to rescue Charlotte.

Johnny accidentally saves the day a few times during the trip, but Miranda is still not impressed. The two fall into a sinkhole and tell the rest of them to go on ahead. A giant goanna named Bull with a thorn in its foot hunts them. Johnny saves Miranda but soon realizes the lizard is suffering and pulls out the thorn. Bull becomes friends with Johnny, and the two koalas ride it out of the caves. Just as Miranda starts to take a liking to Johnny, Boris, the vulture, reveals that Johnny is just a freak show act and the "Koala Kid" thing is just a lie. Miranda tells him to leave but finds out that the gang will need to bring a koala to Bog instead of the real Koala Kid, and Charlotte will have to do. Miranda offers to take her place. Charlotte goes to find Johnny while the kangaroo and the wombat army manage to distract and capture all the gang but the vulture.

Charlotte finds Johnny along with Hamish, Higgens, and a prophetic peg-leg wombat named Quint, and they decide to help Johnny get what he really wants: Miranda. Johnny calls Bull and rides off, saving Miranda. Bog shows up and gives chase, so they head to the circus hoping the Wild Bushman will be able to tame Bog. Bog proves too powerful until Johnny uses the boomerang to bring down the big top on top of Bog (and himself).

Johnny, Miranda, and Bull become the main attraction, and the bad guys get sold as pets. Johnny asks Miranda if she likes her new life, but she is unsure. Plan B is they ride off into the sunset together.

Cast
 Rob Schneider as Johnny the Koala, Mac the Kangaroo, Boy No. 1, narrator
 Bret McKenzie as Hamish the Tasmanian Devil
 Frank Welker as Higgens the Monkey, Bull the Goanna, Bully Koala No. 1, Bully Koala No. 3, Ringmaster
 Alan Cumming as Bog the Crocodile, Bully Koala No. 2
 Yvonne Strahovski as Miranda the Koala
 Tim Curry as Blacktooth the Dingo
 Chris Edgerly as Boris the Vulture
 Jenni Pulos as Charlotte the Koala, Lady, Old Lady
 Charlie Bewley as Loki the Dingo
 Norm Macdonald as Quint the Peg-Leg Wombat
 Eric Lopez as The Wild Bushman, Bill the Wombat, Merlin the Snake
 Nolan North as Hex the Thylacine 
 Phil Proctor as Lug the Lizard
 Neil Ross as Monty the Snake
 Fred Tatasciore as Cutter the Dingo
 Lielle Tova Blinkoff as Little Girl

Reception
The film has grossed $4.6 million at the South Korean box office.

Possible Sequel
According to IMDB, a sequel called "Outback 2: The Rises of Big Cats" is in development and is planned to be released somewhere in 2024.  However, it never was confirmed by the Animation Picture Company as to whether this sequel was actually happening or not.

References

External links

 
 
 SC Films – The Outback
 Screen Daily Outback article

2012 films
2012 action comedy films
2012 computer-animated films
2010s American animated films
2010s adventure comedy films
2010s English-language films
American computer-animated films
American children's animated action films
American children's animated adventure films
American children's animated comedy films
American action comedy films
American adventure comedy films
South Korean animated films
2010s Korean-language films
Animated films about koalas
Fictional Tasmanian devils
Animated films about monkeys
Animated films about kangaroos and wallabies
Animated films about wombats
Animated films about crocodilians
Films about lizards
Animated films about snakes
Animated films about reptiles
Films set in the Outback
Circus films
Films set in 2012
Films scored by Michael Yezerski
Lotte Entertainment films
2010s South Korean films